Titchmarsh Meadow is a  biological Site of Special Scientific Interest north-east of Titchmarsh in Northamptonshire.

This poorly drained field has a rich variety of plant species, including greater bird’s-foot-trefoil, southern marsh-orchid and pepper saxifrage. A medieval fish pond which has been drained has marsh vegetation. Hedges, streams and ditches provide a valuable habitat for invertebrates and small mammals.

The site is private land with no public access.

References

Sites of Special Scientific Interest in Northamptonshire